Hussain Jasim (born 22 July 1966) is an Iraqi athlete. He competed in the men's triple jump at the 1996 Summer Olympics.

References

1966 births
Living people
Athletes (track and field) at the 1996 Summer Olympics
Iraqi male triple jumpers
Olympic athletes of Iraq
Place of birth missing (living people)